Bahadur Singh Chouhan (born 8 February 1946) is a former Indian shot putter. Between 1973 and 1985 he won three gold, two silver and three bronze medals at the Asian Games and Championships. He placed 15th at the 1980 Summer Olympics, and was honoured with Arjuna award and Padma Shri. He is a recipient of Dronacharya Award, by the government of India. Presently he is working as the head coach of the Indian athletics team.

References

External links
 

Indian male shot putters
Living people
Asian Games gold medalists for India
Asian Games silver medalists for India
Recipients of the Arjuna Award
Recipients of the Padma Shri in sports
Recipients of the Dronacharya Award
1946 births
Asian Games medalists in athletics (track and field)
Athletes (track and field) at the 1974 Asian Games
Athletes (track and field) at the 1978 Asian Games
Athletes (track and field) at the 1982 Asian Games
Medalists at the 1974 Asian Games
Medalists at the 1978 Asian Games
Medalists at the 1982 Asian Games
Olympic athletes of India
Athletes (track and field) at the 1980 Summer Olympics
Commonwealth Games competitors for India
Athletes (track and field) at the 1978 Commonwealth Games
Place of birth missing (living people)